Óskar Jónsson born 19 July 1925 –  was an Icelandic middle-distance runner who competed in the 1948 Summer Olympics.

References

1925 births
2016 deaths
Oskar Jonsson
Oskar Jonsson
Athletes (track and field) at the 1948 Summer Olympics